Dodona egeon, the orange Punch, is a small but striking butterfly found in the Indomalayan realm - in Mussoorie to Assam, Burma (nominate) and Peninsular Malaya (D. e. confluens Corbet, 1941) that belongs to the family Riodinidae (which is also known as the Punches and Judies in India).

Description

From Charles Thomas Bingham (1905) The Fauna of British India, Including Ceylon and Burma Butterflies Volume I:
Male. Upperside. Fore wing black, the basal area to the middle of the cell dark ochraceous red; a short, broad, oblique yellow subbasal band from subcostal vein to vein 1; discal yellow spots beyond in interspaces 1, 2, 4 and 5, the upper two and lower two spots respectively separated by the veins only, the latter two spots joined to the subbasal band by an elongate reddish-yellow spot in interspace la; a postdiscal series of a yellow crescent marks surmounted by a yellow spot in interspaces 2 and 3, and three upper postdiscal whitish smaller spots in interspaces 4, 5, 6 shifted somewhat further towards the termen; lastly, two preapical white dots. Hindwing ochraceous yellow, the dorsal margin broadly shaded with brown, a medial straight fascia and an upper shorter discal fascia dark brown; a postdiscal macular, subterminal and terminal more continuous dark brown bands, all three coalescing at the apex; tornal lobe and slender tail black. Underside chestnut-red, with the following more or less silvery markings;Fore wing: a short streak at base of costal margin, transverse basal, medial and discal broad bands, a postdiscal irregular series of transverse spots and a very slender and delicate transverse series of short subterminal lines; between the discal  and postdiscal markings there are two silvery subcostal and a transverse similar spot in interspace 3; the other markings are silvery anteriorly, ochraceous posteriorly. Hind wing: a short transverse silvery streak at base, a narrow similar streak along vein 1 not reaching the tornus, a silvery streak along the dorsal margin turning upwards and joining an interrupted discal silvery transverse fascia from the costa, a broader straight transverse medial band between the discal band and base of wing, a very broad elongate triangular upper postdiscal silvery patch, followed by a series of transverse slender black markings terminating at the apex in two black spots set in a quadrate silvery patch; lobe and slender tail jet-black, margined on the inner side by a white line and surmounted by a grey tornal patch. Antennae, head, thorax and abdomen blackish brown; beneath, palpi, thorax and abdomen greyish white.

Female. Upperside brownish black, much paler than in the male; markings similar but very much larger and paler, especially the upper postdiscal spots on the fore wing. Underside similar to that of the male; groundcolour paler, silvery markings much broader.
Expanse: 44-50 mm
Habitat: Himalayas, Kashmir to Bhutan; Assam, Khasi and Naga Hills.

See also
List of butterflies of India
List of butterflies of India (Riodinidae)

References
 
 

Dodona (butterfly)
Fauna of Pakistan
Butterflies of Asia